Cho La, also transliterated as Tro La, is a mountain pass across the Chola Mountains in Dege County, Garze Prefecture, Sichuan, China. In Mandarin Chinese, it is known as Qu'er Pass. The pass is an important link between the town of Derge and the rest of Sichuan Province. Historically, it was part of a trade route between Tibet and China through the Kingdom of Derge in Kham. The western flank of the pass is drained by the Zhil Chu and the eastern flank is drained by the Tro Chu. Yihun Lhatso, a glacial-fed lake, is located to the east of the pass.

A tunnel constructed under the Chola Mountains now bypasses the mountain pass and is the world's highest vehicular tunnel.  Construction of the tunnel was completed in 2016.

References

Mountain passes of China